Bluetail may refer to:

 Either of two bird species:
 Red-flanked bluetail (Tarsiger cyanurus)
 Himalayan bluetail (Tarsiger rufilatus)
 Various damselflies in the genus Ischnura

Animal common name disambiguation pages